This is a list of vehicles used by the Garda Síochána. Vehicles used by the Garda Síochána are mainly white, with yellow and blue fluorescent livery. Roads Policing unit (formerly traffic corps) vehicles are typically adorned with a battenburg pattern. The Garda insignia is also present on vehicles.

As of April 2016, the Garda Síochána's fleet of 2,676 vehicles was made up of 1,941 cars (758 marked and 1,183 unmarked), 424 vans, 122 motorcycles, 95 four-wheel drive vehicles, and 94 other types. By June 2018, this had increased (by 85) to 2,761 vehicles. The fleet is managed by the Garda Fleet management Section.

In 2020, during the COVID-19 pandemic in the Republic of Ireland, the Garda Síochána hired approximately 200 vehicles to use for community outreach, to collect prescriptions, and to bring isolated and vulnerable people to medical appointments.

Cars

Marked patrol cars 
BMW 5 Series
Ford Mondeo
Ford Focus
Ford Fiesta
Ford Mondeo
Opel Astra
Opel Vectra
Hyundai i30
Hyundai Kona
Hyundai Tucson
Toyota Avensis 
Toyota Corolla
Hyundai i40
Volvo XC70
Toyota RAV4

Unmarked patrol cars 
Audi S3
Audi A6
BMW 5 Series
Ford Focus
Opel Vectra
Hyundai i30
Hyundai Ioniq 5
Mercedes CLS
Toyota Avensis 
Toyota Corolla
Toyota Camry
Hyundai i40
Skoda Superb
Skoda Kodiaq
Volvo V60
Volkswagen Golf R
Hyundai Tucson

4x4

Marked 4x4
Audi Q7
Toyota Landcruiser
Land Rover Defender
Land Rover Discovery
BMW X5
Mitsubishi Shogun
Mitsubishi Pajero
Ford Ranger
Hyundai Tucson
Toyota RAV4

Unmarked 4x4
BMW X5 (armoured)
Toyota Land Cruiser
Audi Q7
Land Rover Discovery
Range Rover (armoured)
Isuzu D-Max
Ford Ranger
Mitsubishi Outlander
Hyundai Tucson

Vans and trucks

Marked vans
Ford Transit
Ford Transit Connect
Fiat Ducato
Opel Combo
Mercedes-Benz Sprinter (mobile command & control centre)
Mercedes-Benz Vario (technical bureau)

Unmarked vans
Ford Tourneo Custom
Fiat Doblo
Ford transit
Opel combo

Motorcycles
BMW K1200GT
BMW R1200RT
BMW F series parallel-twin
Yamaha FJR1300
Honda ST1100
Honda NT700V
Honda NT650V

Bicycles
Giant

Aircraft
Garda Air Support Unit aircraft are flown and maintained by the No. 3 Operations wing of the Irish Air Corps.
 Britten-Norman Defender 4000 (one)
 Eurocopter EC135 T2 (two)

Government / official transport
Audi A6
BMW 5 Series
BMW 7 Series 
BMW X5 (Armoured)
Mercedes-Benz E-Class
Mercedes-Benz S-Class
Volvo S60
Lexus GS
Lexus LS

References

External links

Garda Siochana
Garda Síochána
Vehicles of Ireland